Hang Yihong (born July 1962) is a Chinese engineer who is the party secretary of the China Academy of Engineering Physics since September 2015. He was a representative of the 19th and the 20th National Congress of the Chinese Communist Party. He was an alternate member of the 19th Central Committee of the Chinese Communist Party.

Biography
Hang was born in July 1962.

In January 2012, he was promoted to vice president of the China Academy of Engineering Physics. In September 2015, he was promoted again to become party secretary, the top political position in academy.

References

1962 births
Living people
Chinese politicians
Alternate members of the 19th Central Committee of the Chinese Communist Party